Bengal Institute of Technology (BIT) is a private engineering college located in Kolkata, West Bengal, India. The college was established in the year 2000 with four AICTE approved Courses. It is a part of Techno India Group. The institute is approved by All India Council of Technical Education (AICTE) and affiliated to Maulana Abul Kalam Azad University of Technology (formerly WBUT).

Campus

The college has two campuses, one for Biotechnology Department and the other (aka BIT Main Building) for the remaining departments. Both buildings are entirely covered by Wi-Fi facility. The library has a total collection of 34612 books of almost 3436 titles covering a vast number of subjects. There is a student activity center for co-curricular and extracurricular activities.

Ranking 
Bengal Institute of Technology (NAAC accredited B++)ranked 5th in West Bengal, 91st in India among all Engineering Institutes by NIRF, Dept. of Higher Education, MHRD, Govt. of India in 2016. In 2018, it was in the rank band 151 to 200 and in 2020, it has been ranked in the rank band 251 to 300 by NIRF, Dept. of Higher Education, MHRD, Govt. of India. BIT has also been ranked 51st  according to the digitalLEARNING National Engineering Ranking 2020.

See also

References

Engineering colleges in Kolkata
Colleges affiliated to West Bengal University of Technology
Educational institutions established in 2000
2000 establishments in West Bengal